The Polk County School District is a public school district in Polk County, Georgia, United States, based in Cedartown. It serves the communities of Aragon, Braswell, Cedartown, Rockmart, and Taylorsville. During the 2020-2021 school year, enrollment was listed as 7,837 across all schools.

Schools
The Polk County School District has six elementary schools, two middle schools, and two high schools.

Elementary schools
Northside Elementary School
Eastside Elementary School
Westside Elementary School
Cherokee Elementary School
Van Wert Elementary School
Youngs Grove Elementary School

Middle school
Cedartown Middle School
Rockmart Middle School

High school
Cedartown High School
Rockmart High School

Academies
York Academy

References

External links
Polk County School District
Cedartown High School
Rockmart High School

School districts in Georgia (U.S. state)
Education in Polk County, Georgia